The 1963 NCAA University Division football season was played by American football teams representing 120 colleges and universities recognized the National Collegiate Athletic Association (NCAA) as major programs.  The remaining 299 colleges and universities that were NCAA members and fielded football teams competed in the 1963 NCAA College Division football season.

During the 20th century, the NCAA had no playoff for the major college football teams in the University Division, later known as Division I-A. The NCAA Football Guide, however, did note an "unofficial national champion" based on the top ranked teams in the "wire service" (AP and UPI) polls.  The AP poll in 1963 consisted of the votes of 56 sportswriters, each of whom would give their opinion of the ten best teams.  Under a point system of 10 points for first place, 9 for second, etc., the "overall" ranking was determined.  Although the rankings were based on the collective opinion of the representative sportswriters, the teams that remained "unbeaten and untied" were generally ranked higher than those that had not.  A defeat, even against a strong opponent, tended to cause a team to drop in the rankings, and a team with two or more defeats was unlikely to remain in the Top 10.  The top teams played on New Year's Day in the four major postseason bowl games: the Rose (near Los Angeles at Pasadena), Sugar (New Orleans), Orange (Miami) and Cotton (Dallas).

As the regular season progressed, a new poll would be issued on the Monday following the weekend's games.  The "writers' poll" by Associated Press (AP) was the most popular, followed by the "coaches' poll" by United Press International (UPI).  Both services issued their final polls at the close of the regular season, but before teams competed in bowl games.  The Associated Press presented the "AP Trophy" to the winner.  At the end of the 1963 season, the No. 1 and No. 2 teams (Texas and Navy) met in the Cotton Bowl on January 1, with Texas winning 28 to 6.

In the preseason poll for 1963, the defending national champion USC Trojans were first with 484 points, followed by the Mississippi Rebels with 389 points.

Conference and program changes
 The Big Sky Conference began its first season of play in 1963 in the College Division with four founding members, all independents, from Idaho, Montana, and Utah.

 The Idaho Vandals were also charter members of the Big Sky, but remained independent in football until 1965 and retained University Division status.

September 
In the preseason poll released on September 16, the defending champion USC Trojans were first, followed by Southeastern Conference (SEC) rivals, the Ole Miss Rebels and the Alabama Crimson Tide at second and third.  The Oklahoma Sooners were fourth and the Texas Longhorns were next.

On a Friday night game in New Orleans, No. 5 Texas beat hapless Tulane 21–0 with the help of its "shoeless kicker", Tony Crosby and halfback Phil Harris. The next day, September 21, No. 1 USC shut out Colorado on a muddy field at Boulder, 14–0, with the Trojans' Pete Beathard running for two scores.  No. 2 Ole Miss was held to a scoreless tie at Memphis State, and the result was enough to take the Rebels out of the poll.  No. 3 Alabama won at Georgia, 32–7, and  after falling behind 14-0 at home, No. 4 Oklahoma rallied to beat Clemson 31–14.   In the poll that followed, the results were No. 1 USC, No. 2 Alabama, No. 3 Oklahoma, and No. 4 Texas, with Navy moving from ninth to fifth on the strength of a 51–7 win at West Virginia.

On September 28, No. 1 USC was beaten at home at the Los Angeles Coliseum by No. 3 Oklahoma, 17–12, in a game played in  heat.  Tulane, which had been shut out by Texas the weak before, went scoreless again in a 28–0 loss to No. 2 Alabama.  No. 4 Texas defeated Texas Tech at home, 49–7. No. 5 Navy shut out William & Mary at Annapolis, 28–0.  In the poll, Oklahoma took over first place, Alabama stayed at second, and Texas moved up to third.  Big Ten rivals Northwestern (winning 34–21 over Indiana) and Wisconsin (which beat Notre Dame 14–9 at South Bend) tied at No. 4, while Navy moved down to sixth.

October
Both No. 1 Oklahoma and No. 4 Wisconsin were idle on October 5.  No. 3 Texas beat Oklahoma State at home, 34–7.  No. 2 Alabama beat Vanderbilt in Nashville, 21–6. No. 4 Northwestern lost at Illinois, 10–9, due to a missed extra point and a bad punt that went only five yards and set up the Illini's touchdown.  Jim Plankenhorn connected on a point after and a field goal.   When the poll was released the Sooners were No. 1 and the Longhorns No. 2 as the two teams prepared to meet in Dallas.  Alabama fell to No. 3, Navy rose from 6th place to 4th with a 26–13 win at Michigan, and Wisconsin dropped to No. 5.

Three of the top four teams played at the Cotton Bowl stadium in Dallas the next weekend.  In a Friday night game, No. 4 Navy lost to SMU 32–28.  After Navy had gone ahead 28–26 in the final three minutes, a pass interference call set up the Mustangs' touchdown.  Roger Staubach drove his team to the 7-yard line with :01 to play, but his pass attempt was batted down in the end zone by Tommy Caughren.  Hours later on October 12, at the same venue, No. 1 Oklahoma played against No. 2 Texas before a crowd of 75,504.  Texas won the game 28–7 to take over the top ranking.  Third-ranked Alabama lost on its home field to unranked Florida, 10–6.  Joe Namath scored for the Tide with 2:05 left, but tries for the 2-point conversion and an onside kick both failed.  No. 5 Wisconsin hosted Purdue, winning 38–20.  No. 8 Ohio State, which had shut out its first two opponents, tied Illinois 20–20. No. 6 Pittsburgh and No. 10 Mississippi were both idle, but moved into the top five after the string of losses by higher-ranked teams. The next poll was No. 1 Texas, No. 2 Wisconsin, No. 3 Pittsburgh, No. 4 Ohio State, and No. 5 Mississippi.

In Week Five (October 19, the top three teams managed narrow wins.  Halfback Tommy Ford ran for two scores to help No. 1 Texas beat Arkansas at Little Rock, 17–13.  No. 2 Wisconsin won 10–7 at Iowa, as Paul Krause of the Hawkeyes went for a win instead of a tie with 99 seconds left, and was stopped a foot short of a first down after a fake field goal attempt, and the No. 3 Pitt Panthers came from behind to beat West Virginia, 13–10.  Previously unbeaten No. 4 Ohio State was crushed by USC at before 63,883 fans in Los Angeles, 32–3.  No. 5 Ole Miss became the third Top Five team to shut out Tulane, 21–0, a team that went scoreless in six games in 1963 and finished at 1–8–1.  Ohio State's Big Ten rival, No. 7 Illinois, beat Minnesota 16–6 and replaced the Buckeyes in the next poll: No. 1 Texas, No. 2 Wisconsin, No. 3 Pittsburgh, No. 4 Illinois, and No. 5 Mississippi.

Week Six began with a Friday night 18–12 come-from-behind win by No. 4 Illinois over UCLA at Los Angeles.  The next day, October 26, No. 1 Texas beat Rice at home, 10–6, as Tommy Nobis blocked an extra point, and shoeless Tony Crosby made a field goal.  No. 2 Wisconsin lost 13–10 to Ohio State at home, when Matt Snell drove over for a score with 2:13 left.  Roger Staubach's passing and a defense that made four interceptions drove No. 10 Navy to a 24–12 upset of No. 3 Pittsburgh at Annapolis.  No. 5 Mississippi beat Vanderbilt 27–7.  Texas remained at No. 1 in the next poll, followed by No. 2 Illinois, No. 3 Mississippi, No. 4 Navy, and No. 5 Auburn, which moved from eighth to fifth despite being idle that week.

November
On November 2, all of the top five teams won. No. 1 Texas stayed unbeaten by defeating SMU at Dallas, 17–12, as Crosby made his 21st consecutive point after. No. 2 Illinois rolled over Purdue at home, 41–21 as Jim Grabowski scored three touchdowns and No. 3 Ole Miss overwhelmed LSU 37–3 at Baton Rouge. No. 4 Navy handed Notre Dame its second straight loss on Staubach's passing, 35–14 in South Bend  and No. 5 Auburn won at home over Florida, 19–0.  The poll remained unchanged.

November 9, No. 1 Texas won its eighth straight, 7–0, by shutting down Baylor's passing game.  Longhorns QB Duke Carlisle, playing on defense, intercepted Don Trull's end zone pass with 22 seconds to play, then ran out the clock.  Previously unbeaten No. 2 Illinois had an 8–7 lead with minutes left in a game at home against Michigan, when a fumble gave the Wolverines the ball 11 yards from the goal line, setting up Mel Anthony's winning score for a 14–8 upset. No. 3 Mississippi shut out visiting Tampa, 41-0, No. 4 Navy mauled Maryland 42–7 at home, and No. 5 Auburn fell 13–10 to Mississippi State at Jackson. No. 6 Oklahoma defeated Iowa State 24–14, while No. 9 Michigan State shut out Purdue 23–0.  Texas, the only major team to remain unbeaten and untied, kept the No. 1 spot, followed by No. 2 Navy, No. 3 Mississippi, No. 4 Michigan State, and No. 5 Oklahoma.

November 16, No. 1 Texas went to 9–0 with a 17–0 home win over TCU. No. 2 Navy won 38–25 at Duke and No. 3 Mississippi shut out Tennessee, 20–0, at a game in Memphis. No. 4 Michigan State was trailing Notre Dame 7–6 at home in the fourth quarter, but Sherm Lewis ran 85 yards from scrimmage to win the game, 12–7.  Both of the Spartans' two-point attempts failed. No. 5 Oklahoma won at Missouri 13–3, but dropped to sixth and was replaced by Pittsburgh (which had trounced Army, 28–0) at the fifth spot.  Texas, Navy, Ole Miss, and Michigan State stayed at the top four spots.

Most of the games that had been scheduled for November 23, 1963 were postponed after the assassination of President Kennedy the day before. North Carolina State had played a Friday night game against Wake Forest, winning 42–0, and the Big Ten games were set to continue until Michigan Governor George Romney received a Saturday morning cancellation from Big Ten commissioner Bill Reed.  The Pitt-Penn State game was postponed.  The annual Oklahoma-Nebraska game, which would determine the Big Eight championship and an Orange Bowl berth, was played as scheduled in Lincoln.  No. 10 Nebraska won 29–20 over No. 6 Oklahoma, finishing 7–0 in Big 8 play ahead of the 6–1 Sooners.  The same day, No. 9 Auburn beat Florida State 21–15.  In the Battle for the Rag, LSU defeated Tulane 20–0 in the most recent daytime game at Tiger Stadium not to be televised. The top five in the AP poll remained the same.

On Thanksgiving Day (November 28), No. 1 Texas traveled to College Station to face Texas A&M, and were down 13–9 with only minutes left in the game, when Tommy Wade's pass was picked off by A&M's John Bortheron.  Bortheron fumbled, however, and Texas recovered on the 44 to continue the drive.  Duke Carlisle scored the winning touchdown with 1:19 left, and the Longhorns won 15–13 to finish with a 10–0–0 record. No. 4 Michigan State lost 13–0 at home to No. 8 Illinois in a game that determined the Big Ten championship.  The Illini, who had gone 0–9–0 two years earlier, finished 7–1–1 in 1963.  With a 5–1–1 conference record, Illinois earned a trip to the Rose Bowl, while the Spartans' season ended with a 4–1–1 second-place finish

November 30 saw unbeaten No. 3 Mississippi go for a field goal and a tie against Mississippi State, rather than to try for a touchdown from the 3-yard line on fourth down.  Billy Carl Irwin's 20-yard field goal gave the Rebels a 10–10 tie, sufficient to avoid embarrassment and give the Rebels an unbeaten 7–0–2 record, a 19-game streak without a loss, and the SEC championship.  After the game, Ole Miss accepted an invitation to play against fellow SEC member Alabama in the Sugar Bowl. The No. 5 Pittsburgh Panthers beat the Miami Hurricanes in Florida, 31–20.  In the subsequent poll Texas and Navy remained at No. 1 and No. 2, Illinois was No. 3, and Pitt rose to No. 4.  The No. 9 Auburn Tigers, who had beaten No. 6 Alabama 10–8 at Birmingham, rose to fifth place and earned an Orange Bowl berth against Nebraska.

On December 7, No. 4 Pitt beat Penn State 22–21.  Also, No. 2 Navy played in the annual Army–Navy Game in Philadelphia.  American television viewers were introduced to instant replay after Army's quarterback Rollie Stichweh scored on a two-yard run for the game's first score.  CBS commentator Lindsey Nelson had to explain to the home audience that they were not watching Army score again, saying "Ladies and gentlemen, what you are seeing is a tape of Army's touchdown.  This is not live ...".  Staubach went on to lead Navy to a 21–15 win, after which the players then voted to accept an invitation to play No. 1 Texas in the Cotton Bowl.  In the final AP Poll, the top five remained unchanged, confirming a showdown between the No. 1 and No. 2 teams in Dallas.

Conference standings

Bowl games

Major bowls
Wednesday, January 1, 1964

Despite a 9–1 record and a No. 4 ranking, the Pitt Panthers were not invited to a post-season bowl game.  The bowls, who feared inviting Pitt before their postponed season finale against Penn State, signed other teams, leaving Pitt without a bowl invitation. The 1963 Panthers were perhaps the best team of the modern football era to be snubbed by the bowls.  When they did beat Penn State on December 7, it was too late. The Sugar Bowl selected a second SEC team, third-place finisher Alabama, to face SEC champ Ole Miss, while 2nd place Auburn was picked by the Orange Bowl to meet Big 8 champion Nebraska.  The Rose Bowl pitted Big Ten titlist Illinois against unranked Washington, which was 6–5 overall but which had won the AAWU crown by going 4–1 in conference play.

In the Cotton Bowl, the Longhorns' Duke Carlisle guided Texas to a score six plays after kickoff and to a 21–0 lead by halftime.  Navy's Roger Staubach saw a second defeat at Dallas (after an earlier loss to SMU), but would go on to a remarkable career there in the NFL.  Staubach ran two yards for a touchdown late in the game in the 28–6 loss.  Navy head coach Wayne Hardin said after the game that there was "no team more deserving of being No. 1 than Texas."  Alabama won the Sugar Bowl 12–7 on four field goals by Tim Davis, including 46 and 48 yards.  Auburn drove down to the 11-yard line with 90 seconds left, but Nebraska batted down Jimmy Sidle's 4th down pass attempt to preserve a 13–7 win.  And after taking a 7–3 lead at halftime, on a touchdown by Dave Kopay, Washington fell to a comeback attempt led by All-Americans Jim Grabowski and Dick Butkus in the Rose Bowl.

Other bowls

 Prior to the 1975 season, the Big Ten and Pac-8 (AAWU) conferences allowed only one postseason participant each, for the Rose Bowl.
 This was the final Liberty Bowl in Philadelphia; it was played indoors in Atlantic City in 1964, then relocated to Memphis.

Heisman Trophy voting
The Heisman Trophy is given to the year's most outstanding player

Source:

See also
 1963 NCAA University Division football rankings
 1963 College Football All-America Team
 1963 NCAA College Division football season
 1963 NAIA football season

References